John Gaul Lebo  was born on (March 15, 1972). He is a lawyer and legislator in Cross River, one of Nigeria's oil-rich state.

Lebo is a former two-term member and Speaker of the Cross River State House of Assembly representing Abi State Constituency. He is married to Barr Binta Gaul Lebo, and they are blessed with three children. He has an interest in leading innovations, impacting change in the world and building personal capacity to compete in the new knowledge economy. He is committed to transparency and accountability.

Education
Lebo started his studies at St. Bernard's Primary School Ibalebo, Adadama Abi LGA and went further to gain his WASSCE at St. Brendan's Secondary School, iyamoyong in Obubra LGA. He got admission to study Law at the University of Calabar Nigeria where he graduated with an LL.B. in 1996. In 1997, he got admission to further his studies at the Nigerian Law School where he obtained the qualification to become a Barrister at Law and Solicitor of the Supreme Court of Nigeria in 1998.

He has gone further to gain more knowledge at Lagos Business School where he trained on leading innovation and change, He has a Diploma in Business advisory services, strategic planning and management at  Regenesys Business School Johannesburg South Africa, an Executive Masters in Business administration from the Dubai Business School at the Dubai World Trade Centre, an International Diploma in Climate Change Law from the Institute of Parliamentary and Political Law in London, a master's degree in International Economic Law.  
Lebo also attended the 2017 Special Selected (G65) Emerging Leaders Executive Leadership Course at the Kennedy School of Harvard University where he specialized in Decision Science, in April 2018 he did a Second Course on Transformational Leadership in the 21st Century Africa and specialized in Adaptive Leadership at the Kennedy School of Harvard University. He has just concluded his Harvard University fellowship programme on Decision Science with focus on Reinvented Service Delivery and value chain mechanism for Governance in Africa at the Aga Khan University in Kenya in partnership with the Harvard Kennedy School. He became an alumnus of the Kennedy School of Harvard University in November 2017.

Political career 
 In 2011, Lebo won sufficient votes at the primaries of the People's Democratic Party (Nigeria) to run in that year's general election for a seat to represent Abi local government of Cross River state in the House of Assembly. He was elected on June 10, 2015 as the Speaker of the Cross River state House of Assembly. He was the Pioneer Chairman of People's Democratic Party (Nigeria) Speakers' Forum and Secretary Speakers' forum Ad-Hoc Committee on the ongoing Constitutional amendment of Nigeria.

In 2007, he was appointed a member of the Cross River State Legal team, which drafted a state policy for legal regulatory framework to promote the IT economy of the state and facilitate the growth of local entrepreneurs in the Industry. He was a member of the transition committee of Cross River state in 2007. Lebo is still seen as a rights activist, although in recent years, he has played less activist roles as he becomes more deeply involved in leadership at both national and state levels.

Legislative career 
In 2011, Lebo as a first timer had a very impressive scorecard, which led to his return to the house in 2015. As a first-timer in the assembly, he was appointed into the following House committees;

 Chairman - House committee on Due process, Donor support and Inter-Governmental Affairs.
 Chairman - AdHoc committee on State Boundaries.
 V. Chairman - House committee on Judiciary.
 Member - House committee on Agriculture

As a member, Lebo sponsored a good number of bills in his first tenure, which got him voted as the Best Lawmaker in the Cross River State House of Assembly by the People's Democratic Party South South Zone. He sponsored and argued successfully the highest number of motions in the Assembly. Lebo sponsored the following Private member's bill's;

 A Bill for the Establishment of Songhai Farms in Itigidi, Abi.
 A Bill to create the Cross River State College of Nursing in Abi.
 A Bill to include 7 communities in Cross River State under the CRS BODERCOM law, of which communities in Abi became Beneficiaries.

Lebo also organized different empowerment programmes and sponsored his constituents to different training's in his first tenure. He sponsored over 50 Abi students in higher institutions through the John Gaul Lebo scholarship. He also sponsored for the training of more than 100 Abi indigene's at the CBN's Enterprise Development center (EDC) in calabar, the training and empowerment of 30 Abi women under Small Scale and Medium Enterprise (SME)/ Forever Living Products. He is the first legislator to pay Constituency allowance to the 10 council wards of Abi. The above excludes personal benevolence via financial assistance to individuals, families, churches and communities and also job and contract facilitation for Abi indigene.

Professional career 
 Lebo is a barrister and solicitor of the Supreme Court of Nigeria and called to the bar on 23 February 1998, he has acquired 17 years post call experience and is a national public of the Supreme Court of Nigeria.  He has engaged in active law practice for 14 straight years before his political career.  He has served as law lecturer in the University of Abuja, managing editor of Law Reports of Nigeria. His firm, Gaul-Gate Law, was the first to introduce ICT law Report to the Supreme Court of Nigeria and organized the first online bar conference. Currently, Gaul-Gate Law is a leading firm in developing ICT Law solutions for Nigerian Courts and pioneering an E- judiciary system which includes an online version of the Supreme Court of Nigeria Judgements,  Judgements from the  Courts of Appeals and Laws of the Federation of Nigeria.

Global and continental leadership engagements 
Lebo has been of several international assignments for his country. In 2015, he attended the ceremony 46th Commonwealth Parliamentary Association African region annual parliament meetings for Legislative Direction and Conversation in Nairobi where the Assembly under his leadership was internationally celebrated for inventing the Citizens Legislative Agenda Project (CLAP). In February 2015, he attended the United Nations General Assembly in New York which was very significant because it heralded the deceleration of the Sustainable Development Goals (SDGs) of which the state legislature had already contemplated and created a legislative framework, awaiting the United Nations General Assembly adoption of the global goals; an initiative the United Nations saw as Novel.

Lebo also attended a four-day professional training on Strategic Climate Change Adaptation by the International centre for parliamentary studies and became an alumnus of the International centre of parliamentary studies in London 2015. In November 2016, Lebo participated at the 22nd session of the Marrakech World Climate Change Conference, Moscow an annual Conference of Parties(COP) meeting on climate change which saw World leaders of the 22 members countries in attendance, the conference successfully demonstrated to the world that the implementation of the Paris Agreement is underway and the constructive spirit of multilateral cooperation on climate change continues.

Lebo, in February 2017, participated at the 5th session of the  World Government Summit in Dubai, where he participated in different sessions on Decision architecture, Future of governance and in developing Special Legislative purpose vehicle (LPV) which would help to facilitate qualitative service and development across the globe.

Alumni and fellowships 
Lebo has acquired a good number of fellowships and alumni to his name as follows;

 Fellow Chartered Institute of Arbitrators
 Fellow Institute of Strategic Management, FISM.
 Fellow Chartered Management Institute, FCMI.
 Fellow Institute of Corporate Management, FICM.
 Fellow Chartered Institute of Project management professionals, CIMP.
 Alumni John Kennedy school of government alumni 2017, Harvard University Boston, SA.
 Alumni Regenesys Business School, Johannesburg, South Africa.

Honours and awards 
Lebo is a recipient of several awards and honors on good governance, leadership excellence, youth development and contributions to humanity. In February 2017, Lebo was given an award by the Ghana civilian institute of Administration for promoting a model in Legislative Administration which is part of the Commonwealth Parliamentary Association annual performance review and referral award. In recognition of his efforts, he was invited to participate at the 5th session of the World Government Summit in 2017. He was awarded the prestigious Nnamdi Azikiwe Zik international Leadership Prize award for best state legislature leadership in Nigeria 2017.

Online articles 
 Creative Disruption, Newcomers in Technology and Future of Innovation.
 Parliament 2.0: The Future of Law-making.

References 

 https://medium.com/@Blecyn1/rt-hon-barr-john-gaul-lebo-knowledge-management-and-youth-development-   513913c7aa05

Living people
1972 births
Peoples Democratic Party members of the Senate (Nigeria)
Members of the Cross River State House of Assembly